The Weymouth Meeting House Historic District encompasses one of the oldest sections of Weymouth, Massachusetts.  This area, centered on a cluster of properties near Church, East, Green, North, and Norton Streets, includes the city's oldest cemetery (the North Cemetery, established c. 1636), the site of its first meeting house, the 1833 church of its first congregation, the birthplace of presidential wife and mother Abigail Adams, and the John Adams School, Weymouth's oldest surviving schoolhouse.  The area was the center of Weymouth until 1723, and then North Weymouth until 1833.

The district was added to the National Register of Historic Places in 2010.

See also
National Register of Historic Places listings in Norfolk County, Massachusetts

References

Historic districts in Norfolk County, Massachusetts
Weymouth, Massachusetts
National Register of Historic Places in Norfolk County, Massachusetts
Historic districts on the National Register of Historic Places in Massachusetts